is a former Japanese football player and manager. He played for Japan national team. His brother Takashi Kuwahara is also former footballer.

Club career
Kuwahara was born in Fujieda on May 30, 1944. After graduating from high school, he played for Nippon Light Metal and Nagoya Mutual Bank. In 1971, Nagoya Mutual Bank was disbanded and he retired.

National team career
On March 22, 1965, Kuwahara debuted for Japan national team against Burma. On March 25, he also played against Singapore. He played 2 games for Japan in 1965.

Coaching career
After retirement, Kuwahara became a manager for Japanese Regional Leagues club Honda in 1973. He promoted the club to Japan Soccer League Division 2 in 1975 and Division 1 in 1981. He resigned in 1982. In 1987, he became a manager new club PJM Futures and managed until 1992.

National team statistics

References

External links
 
 Japan National Football Team Database

1944 births
Living people
Association football people from Shizuoka Prefecture
Japanese footballers
Japan international footballers
Japan Soccer League players
Hagoromo Club players
Nagoya WEST FC players
Japanese football managers
Association football forwards
People from Fujieda, Shizuoka